Lord Robert Montagu PC (24 January 1825 – 6 May 1902) was a British Conservative politician. He served as Vice-President of the Committee on Education between 1867 and 1868.

Background and education
Montagu was born at Melchbourne, Bedfordshire the second son of George Montagu, 6th Duke of Manchester by his first wife Millicent, daughter of Robert Bernard Sparrow. William Montagu, 7th Duke of Manchester, was his elder brother. He was educated at Trinity College, Cambridge, and graduated with an MA in 1849.

Political career

Montagu sat as Member of Parliament for Huntingdonshire from 1859 to 1874 and for Westmeath from February 1874 until he retired in 1880. He held office under the Earl of Derby and Benjamin Disraeli as Vice-President of the Committee on Education from March 1867 until the fall of the government in December 1868 and was sworn of the Privy Council in 1867. He was an advocate of protectionist policies. He was a member of the Carlton Club and the Athenaeum Club.

Family
Montagu married firstly Ellen Cromie, born in 1825, daughter of John Cromie, at Portstewart on 12 February 1850. They had four children although their first son, John, died as a child. Ellen died aged 32 on 11 July 1857 at Portstewart, County Londonderry. Montagu remarried in London on 18 October 1862 to Elizabeth Wade (Holton, Suffolk, 15 May 1839 – London, 29 December 1908), daughter of William Wade of Holton, Suffolk, and had six more children. This second marriage scandalized society, since the former Betsy Wade had been a housemaid when Montagu met her. Montagu died 6 May 1902 at 91 Queens Gate, South Kensington, London and was buried in Kensal Green Cemetery.

References

External links 
 

1825 births
1902 deaths
Burials at Kensal Green Cemetery
Conservative Party (UK) MPs for English constituencies
Irish Conservative Party MPs
Members of the Parliament of the United Kingdom for County Westmeath constituencies (1801–1922)
Robert Montagu
People from the Borough of Bedford
UK MPs 1859–1865
UK MPs 1865–1868
UK MPs 1868–1874
UK MPs 1874–1880
Younger sons of dukes
Alumni of Trinity College, Cambridge
Members of the Privy Council of the United Kingdom